The Fulton Mall was a six-block corridor in downtown Fresno, California which was closed to traffic in 1964 and made into a pedestrians only mall. Despite opening to much fanfare, the downtown mall suffered from the city's suburban expansion, especially the opening of the Fashion Fair Mall six miles to the north. By the 1980s, most storefronts on the mall were empty and plans to renovate the mall were discussed. In 2017, car traffic was reintroduced to the street after most the public art and amenities had been relocated to sidewalk areas.

The mall was an early example of the design intent and masterplan-oriented thought process of shopping mall pioneer Victor Gruen, whose ideas were emulated, albeit in a modified form, across the United States. The mall is also an example of noted landscape architect Garrett Eckbo's modernist landscape design ethos.

History

Pedestrian mall 
Fulton Street, originally J Street, has been a main corridor for business activity for Fresno since the city's inception. It sits a block over from the Central Pacific Railroad Station, the primary way early visitors came to Fresno. J Street was renamed "Fulton" in honor of prominent local financier Fulton G. Berry after his death in 1910.  

Several notable buildings were constructed on Fulton Street, including the 10-story Helm Building in 1914, which was called Fresno's first skyscraper. Locally-founded Gottschalks moved into a large retail space on Fulton Street in 1914. The 8-story Bank of Italy building followed in 1918 as well as the Rustigian Building on the south end of Fulton Street, completed in 1920. Adding to the retail activity in the area, the Radin-Kamp Department Store opened on Fulton Street in 1924. The historic San Joaquin Light and Power Corporation Building and the Warnors Theater sit on the north end of Fulton Street, both built in the 1920s.

Fresno experienced a population boom after World War II, reaching 100,000 in 1958. Much of the growth pushed northward, with Fresno State relocating in 1956. Retail centers opened to the north in the late 1950s as well, such as Manchester Center and Fig Garden Village. To revitalize downtown, the Arthur L. Selland-led city of Fresno hired pioneering Austrian architect Victor Gruen who had attempted similar revitalization projects in Kalamazoo, Michigan and Fort Worth, Texas.

Under Gruen's supervision, Fulton street was transformed into a pedestrian-only space named Fulton Mall. The project was designed by American landscape architect Garrett Eckbo, as part of his EDAW landscape architecture design firm. The mall was dedicated on September 1, 1964, to much fanfare. The mall contained major retailers such as Gottschalks, Montgomery Ward, Woolworth, and JCPenney.

The opening of Fashion Fair Mall in 1970 indicated that the Fresno's northward sprawl was not abating. The Fulton Mall declined, with one notable example occurring in 1988 when Gottschalks, an anchor since 1914, moved from the mall to the Woodward Park area.

Fresno poet Gary Soto memorialized the street scene of Fulton Mall in a 2001 poem.

Reintroducing traffic 
In 2002, a city redevelopment agency presented a plan to the City Council proposing to return auto traffic to the Fulton Mall. The move was opposed by a group of citizens called the Downtown Fresno Coalition. In 2006, the City Council called for another study of the Fulton Mall so that a decision could be made but the standoff only intensified.

In 2008, the preservationist citizens group prepared a nomination of the Fulton Mall to the National Register of Historic Places in an effort to block or complicate the reintroduction of cars. The mall was deemed eligible for the register of historic places but was not placed on the register due to objections from the city administration and a majority of the property owners.

Mayor Ashley Swearengin commissioned a plan which included three options for renovating the mall. Two of the options returned car traffic with varying degrees of preservation of the existing mall features and amenities. The third option kept the mall pedestrian free. 

In September 2013, the City of Fresno received a $15.9 million TIGER Grant from the US Department of Transportation to reintroduce traffic to Fulton.  On February 27, 2014, the Fresno City Council decided the fate of Fulton Mall with a 5–2 vote in favor of putting traffic back on Fulton street while preserving as much of the character of the original design as possible. 

A groundbreaking ceremony was held on March 3, 2016. The $20 million project was completed in October 2017 and the reopening was attended by mayor Lee Brand, former mayor Swearengin, representative Jim Costa and others.

Notable features

Public Art
Money was raised from private donors to buy or commission public art and install it on the mall.

 The Visit by Clement Renzi.
 Talos by James Lee Hansen, a predecessor to Talos No. 2 in Portland, Oregon.
 Aquarius Ovoid by George Tsutakawa, a brass sculpture.
 Dancing Waters by Stan Bitters.
 Valley Landing by Gordon Newell, a sculpture made of black granite from a local quarry.
 La Grand Laveuse (Washer Woman) by Pierre Auguste Renoir.
 A concrete platform commemorating the location where the Industrial Workers of the World fought for the right of free speech in their efforts to organize labor in Fresno. It is registered on the list of California Historical Landmarks as number 873.
It includes four clocks at the top which face in each direction.
 Big A by Peter Voulkos, a sculpture consisting of aluminum pillars and cross plates with bronze ovals on the plates.
 Orion by Bernard Rosenthal.
 Smoldering Fires by Claire Falkenstein.
 Yokuts Native American by Clement Renzi, a cast bronze sculpture representing a member of the Yokuts tribe standing with his arms stretched upward to greet the rising run.
Obos are said to represent stacked stones found in the Himlayas.

Most mall features were relocated from the middle of the mall to the sidewalk areas in 2016, making way for vehicular traffic. There were moved to approximately following locations:

References

External links

Look Around, Follow Me: The Art, Architecture, & Politics of the Fresno Fulton Art Mall, 2016 Documentary Film Archive
Fresno: A City Reborn, 1968 documentary film
Fulton Mall Public Art a Walking Tour
Fulton Mall at City of Fresno website

Pedestrian malls in the United States
Shopping districts and streets in the United States
Shopping malls established in 1964
1964 establishments in California